James Lilburn "Pat" Coffee (August 3, 1915 – January 25, 1986) was a professional American football halfback and quarterback in the National Football League (NFL). He played for the Chicago Cardinals in 1937 and 1938. He set an NFL record in 1937 with the Cardinals with a 97-yard touchdown pass to receiver Gaynell Tinsley.

References

External links
Pro-Football-Reference

1915 births
1986 deaths
American football quarterbacks
Chicago Cardinals players
LSU Tigers football players